Ponte de Assureira is a bridge in Melgaço, Viana do Castelo District, Portugal.

See also
List of bridges in Portugal

References

Bridges in Viana do Castelo District
Buildings and structures in Melgaço, Portugal
Properties of Public Interest in Portugal
Castro Laboreiro